Erik Eriksson (28 October 1914 – 24 April 1990) was a Swedish football player and manager who spent most of his career at IK Brage. He joined the club's youth team in 1929 after being discovered while playing for a school team. The year after he started playing with the reserves and in 1933 he finally got to join the first team. He played for the club until 1945, acting as a player manager for the last few years. In 1939 he played his only game with the national team against Lithuania.

References

External links
 

1914 births
1990 deaths
IK Brage players
IK Brage managers
Swedish footballers
Sweden international footballers
Swedish football managers
People from Borlänge Municipality
Association football defenders
Sportspeople from Dalarna County